The Invincible Masked Rider is a 1963 adventure film directed by Umberto Lenzi. It was based on a novel by Johnston McCulley. The film was released in the US as Terror of the Black Mask.

It starred Pierre Brice, Daniele Vargas and Helene Chanel.

Cast 
 Pierre Brice: Don Diego Morales
 Daniele Vargas: Don Luis 
 Hélène Chanel: Carmencita 
 Massimo Serato: Don Rodrigo 
 Gisella Arden: Maria 
 Aldo Bufi Landi: Francisco 
 Carlo Latimer: Tabuca 
 Nerio Bernardi: Don Gomez 
 Romano Ghini: Maurilio 
 Tullio Altamura: Dr. Bernarinis 
 Guido Celano: Dr. Aguilera  
 Nello Pazzafini: Alonzo

Release
The Invincible Masked Rider was released theatrically in Italy on 29 March 1963. It received a released in the United States on July 1967.

See also
List of Italian films of 1963

References

Footnotes

Sources

External links

1963 films
1963 adventure films
Italian adventure films
Films directed by Umberto Lenzi
Films based on works by Johnston McCulley
1960s Italian films